Django is an album by the Modern Jazz Quartet, first released on 12-inch LP in 1956.

Overview
The actual sessions had taken place in June 1953, December 1954, and January 1955, and (as Prestige Records had yet to enter the 12-inch LP era) were first released on two 10-inch albums, entitled Modern Jazz Quartet (PRLP 160, 1953, whose second side contained "The Queen's Fancy", "Delauney's Dilemma", "Autumn In New York" and "But Not For Me") and The Modern Jazz Quartet, Vol. 2 (PRLP 170, 1955, containing "Django", "One Bass Hit", "Milano" and "La Ronde Suite"). The first session took place in New York, but the eventual Hackensack, New Jersey sessions were engineered by Rudy Van Gelder; the whole album was reissued in 2006 as part of the Rudy Van Gelder Remasters collection.

"Django" (like the other original material on the album) was composed by the group's pianist and musical director, John Lewis. It is one of his best-known compositions, written in memory of the Belgian gypsy guitarist Django Reinhardt. One other apostrophic tune is "Delauney's Dilemma", a jaunty tribute to the French jazz critic Charles Delaunay. The lengthy "La Ronde Suite", with discrete sections emphasizing each group member's contributions, is in fact a version of the standard "Two Bass Hit", written by Lewis for Dizzy Gillespie and recorded by, among others, Miles Davis on Milestones. Gillespie's own tune, "One Bass Hit", is also included as a feature for bassist Percy Heath.

Vibraphonist Milt "Bags" Jackson can be heard grunting and humming throughout the quieter numbers, which include renditions of the Gershwins' "But Not For Me" and the Vernon Duke standard "Autumn In New York".

Reception

Writing for All About Jazz, Douglas Payne described Django as "classic jazz in construction and execution" and said it was "the place to begin appreciating the many and great virtues of one of jazz's finest aggregates". AllMusic's Lindsay Planer wrote that "In terms of seminal Modern Jazz Quartet entries, it is hard to exceed the variety of styles and performances gathered on Django."

Track listing
"Django" (John Lewis) – 7:03
"One Bass Hit" (Dizzy Gillespie) – 2:59
"La Ronde Suite" (Lewis) – 9:38
"The Queen's Fancy" (Lewis) – 3:12
"Delauney's Dilemma" (Lewis) – 4:01
"Autumn In New York" (Vernon Duke) – 3:40
"But Not for Me" (George Gershwin, Ira Gershwin) – 3:44
"Milano" (Lewis) – 4:23

Personnel
Milt Jackson — vibraphone
John Lewis — piano
Percy Heath — bass
Kenny Clarke — drums

References

External links
NPR Basic Jazz Record Library recommendation

1956 albums
Cool jazz albums
Post-bop albums
Modern Jazz Quartet albums
Prestige Records albums
Albums produced by Bob Weinstock
Albums recorded at Van Gelder Studio
Albums produced by Ira Gitler